In direct response to election changes related to the COVID-19 pandemic and 2020 United States presidential election in Georgia; the Donald Trump 2020 presidential campaign launched numerous lawsuits contesting the election processes of Georgia. All of these were either dismissed or dropped.

Summary of lawsuits

In re: Enforcement of Election Laws and Securing Ballots Cast or Received after 7:00pm on November 3, 2020 
The lawsuit, regarding 53 ballots, was filed by the Trump campaign and the Georgia Republican Party on November 4 in the Chatham County Superior Court of the Eastern Judicial Circuit of Georgia. The campaign claimed that two witnesses had seen late ballots being improperly mixed with on-time ballots. Superior Court Judge James F. Bass Jr. denied the request and dismissed the suit on November 5, after hearing testimony from the chairman of the Chatham County Board of Registrars. The judge ruled that no evidence had been produced that the ballots were late.

Brooks v. Mahoney 
On November 11, 2020, four voters in Georgia sued Thomas Mahoney, Chairman of the Chatham County Board of Elections, in federal district court. The voters claimed a software glitch caused a miscounting of votes, and asked the court to stop certain counties from certifying their presidential election results. On November 16, the plaintiffs voluntarily dismissed the case.

Wood v. Raffensperger 
The lawsuit was filed by L. Lin Wood Jr. on November 13 in the United States District Court for the Northern District of Georgia. The plaintiff claimed that the balloting result in Georgia was defective and should be either invalidated or modified (i.e. having cured absentee ballots removed) because Georgia Secretary of State Brad Raffensperger and other government officials had no statutory authority to change election law to relax signature match requirement or to allow curing of absentee ballots. These changes to the voting process were introduced as the result of a settlement of an earlier lawsuit with the Democratic Party of Georgia on March 6, 2020. An amended complaint was filed on November 16, 2020, to include additional complaints about the automatic recount process.

On November 19, Judge Steven Grimberg ruled that Wood lacked legal standing to bring the case, had brought it too late, and had not advanced arguments that were likely to win the case. The judge stated that Wood failed to show that he had been harmed, while his proposal would "harm the public in countless ways". The Trump-appointed judge concluded that there was "no basis in fact or in law" to stop Georgia's certification of its election results (in which Joe Biden defeated Donald Trump) at such a late stage, as this would "breed confusion and potential disenfranchisement".

On December 5, a three-judge panel on the United States Court of Appeals for the Eleventh Circuit unanimously affirmed the district court's decision, because Wood "fails to allege a particularized injury", and in any case, his request to delay certification was moot because Georgia had by then already certified its election results.

On December 11, Wood filed the case with the Supreme Court, which denied the petition on February 22, 2021.

Pearson v. Kemp 
On November 25, 2020, a group of voters led by teenage conservative activist CJ Pearson sued Brian Kemp, the governor of Georgia, and other state officials. The plaintiffs claimed that the use of Dominion Voting Systems, a company that provides voting software and hardware across the U.S., violated state and federal law, and that Dominion was "founded by foreign oligarchs and dictators to ensure computerized ballot-stuffing and vote manipulation to whatever level was needed to make certain Venezuelan dictator Hugo Chávez never lost another election." The plaintiffs alleged that Dominion was used to rig votes for Joe Biden, and asked the court to stop the certification of elections results and order Governor Kemp to certify President Donald Trump as the winner in Georgia. This so-called "Kraken" lawsuit, along with King v. Whitmer, was filed in federal court by conservative lawyer Sidney Powell. The evidence included an affidavit from QAnon activist Ron Watkins, who stated, based his reading of an online user guide for Dominion Voting Systems software, that election fraud might be "within the realm of possibility". 

Dominion responded publicly with a point-by-point rebuttal of the claims, calling them "baseless, senseless, [and] physically impossible."

A hearing was held on November 29, after which U.S. District Judge Timothy Batten ordered Cobb, Gwinnett, and Cherokee counties to preserve their voting machines and refrain from resetting them; he declined to immediately grant a request by the defendants to order a forensic examination of the voting machines. Both parties filed an interlocutory appeal of that decision with the U.S. Court of Appeals for the Eleventh Circuit (Case No. 20-14480). On December 4, the Eleventh Circuit dismissed the appeals, reasoning that the appellate court did not have jurisdiction to hear the appeal.

Shortly after this ruling, Judge Batten held a hearing in the district court for December 7, to address the plaintiff's request to inspect ballot machines; he dismissed the case from the bench that day The judge ruled that the plaintiffs did not have legal standing to bring the case, filed the case too late (as the Dominion machines were adopted months earlier), and filed the case in the wrong venue (of which the right venue would be a state court). In any case, the relief sought by Powell, which was to decertify Georgia's election results, was impossible to grant, stated the judge.

On December 8, the plaintiffs filed an appeal (Case No. 20-14579) of Batten's decision in the U.S. Court of Appeals for the Eleventh Circuit.

US Supreme Court Docket No. 20-816 (In Re Coreco Ja'Qan Pearson, et al., Petitioners)

* December 11, 2020: Petition for a writ of mandamus filed. (Response due January 14, 2021)

* December 15, 2020: Supplemental Brief of Coreco Ja'Qan Pearson, et al. submitted.

* December 18, 2020: Motion to Consolidate and Expedite Consideration of the Emergency Petition and, to Expedite Merits Briefing and Oral Argument in the Event that the Court Grants the Petition, and to Expedite Consideration of this Motion of Coreco Ja'Qan Pearson, et al. submitted.

* January 11, 2021: Motion to expedite consideration filed by petitioners DENIED

* January 19, 2021: Joint Stipulation to Dismiss Appeal of Coreco Ja'Qan Pearson, et al. submitted.

Boland v. Raffensperger 
On November 30, 2020, a Georgia voter, Paul Andrew Boland, sued state election officials in state court. Boland alleged that the defendants failed to follow the election code based on a low ballot rejection rate for signature mismatch; he also alleged that about 20,000 people who do not live in Georgia voted there. Boland asked the court for an audit of the ballots, or to otherwise decertify the state's election results. In court, the defense disagreed that signature matching was done improperly and argued that voters have legitimate reasons to temporarily move out of Georgia.

The suit was dismissed by Superior Court Judge Emily K. Richardson, who said that the plaintiff lacked standing, failed to state a claim, and that the suit was not filed in a timely manner or against the correct parties. Boland appealed to the Supreme Court of Georgia, which rejected the requests in his petition.

Trump v. Raffensperger 

On December 4, 2020, the Trump campaign filed a lawsuit against state election officials in the Superior Court of Fulton County. The plaintiffs alleged multiple violations of Georgia's election code and state constitution, and claimed thousands of illegitimate votes were cast. As a remedy, the plaintiffs asked the court to nullify the results of the election and order a new one. The filing was initially rejected due to the plaintiff's failure to pay the filing fee and complete the prerequisite paperwork, but was corrected later that day.

Trump, joined by Georgia Republican Party Chairman David Shafer, filed an appeal with the Supreme Court of Georgia on December11, asking it to hear the case within the next three days (i.e. before the Electoral College voted); the next day, the Court unanimously declined to hear the case, with Justice Harold Melton finding that "petitioners have not shown that this is one of those extremely rare cases that would invoke our original jurisdiction".

Favorito et al. v. Fulton County et al. 
A lawsuit was filed December 23, 2020, which primarily sought to have absentee ballots be subjected to additional inspections for potential counterfeits, and the defendants were required to produce ballots for additional inspection by the plaintiffs during the course of the case. The case was eventually dismissed on October 13, 2021, for lack of standing.

Trump v. Kemp et al. 
Trump v. Kemp et al. was filed on December 31, 2020, three days before the phone call at the center of the Trump–Raffensperger scandal. The motion for a preliminary injunction was denied following a hearing on Jan 5.

On January 7, 2021, Trump voluntarily dismissed the lawsuit, citing a "settlement agreement". Raffensperger disputes any such "settlement agreement" was obtained, but did not oppose the voluntary dismissal.

“Rather than presenting their evidence and witnesses to a court and to cross-examination under oath, the Trump campaign wisely decided the smartest course was to dismiss their frivolous cases,” Raffensperger said.

Notes

References 

Donald Trump litigation
United States lawsuits